Olga Chartzinikolaou (born in Athens on 4 July 1981) is a retired Greek basketball 1.81 m. wing, who last played for Panathinaikos in the Greek Championship. She is a member of the Greek national team.

Career
 1997–2001  Ilioupoli
 2001–2005  Asteras Exarchion
 2005–2009  Esperides Kallitheas
 2009–2012  Athinaikos
 2012–2015  Caja Rural
 2015–2018  Olympiacos
 2021–2022  Panathinaikos

References

1981 births
Living people
Greek women's basketball players
Olympiacos Women's Basketball players
Panathinaikos WBC players
Guards (basketball)
Greek expatriate basketball people in Spain
Basketball players from Athens